Nokuthula Ledwaba (born 1983), is a South African actress. She is best known for her roles in the popular serials Rhythm City and The River.

Personal life
She was born in 1983 in Mofolo area in Soweto, South Africa. Her mother, Grace Vilakazi-Ledwaba gave birth to her at a very young age. Her father later died 33 years ago when her mother was still pregnant. Having had children at a young age, her mother had a difficult time raising them. Therefore, she handed over Nokuthala to her aunt. Then she grew up in Soshanguve, Northern Pretoria with her aunt. After becoming a teen girl, she got to know about her family as well as her father called Mavuso. Then she went to see her mother and lived with her. However, her mother died in September 2015.

Career
She began her career at the age of nineteen where she did a lot of children's and educational theatre productions that toured South Africa and the UK. Her first role was in the show Wild Child Lu. Then she acted in the popular television serials Rhythm City in 2007 where she played the popular role of 'Tshidi Khuse'. In 2009, she was nominated as the Best Supporting Actress during the 3rd South African Film and Television Awards (SAFTAs).

In 2018, she was invited to act in the television series The River. In the series, she played the role of 'Angel' and continued to play the role in first and second seasons of the show. Apart from these popular television serials, she has acted in the series Abomama as 'Mapule' and on Ambitions as 'Thembi'. She also played supportive roles in the serials Hard Copy, Backstage, Umlilo and Scandal!. In the remake of original 1977 version of American mini-series Roots, Nokuthula played a lead role as 'Kunta Kinte's mother'.

In the e.tv drama series Umlilo, she starred the role as 'Dumile', a city girl born and raised in Soweto who is the second wife in a polygamous marriage.

Filmography
 Hard Copy as Leah Gumede
 Umlilo as Dumile Simelane / Dumile
 Roots as Binta Kinte
 Mandela: Long Walk to Freedom as Courthouse Young Woman
 Mary and Martha as Micaela
 Rhythm City as Tshidi Khuse
 The River as Angelina
 Abomama as Mapule
 Ambitions as Thembi
 Reyka as Portia

References

External links
 
 Masasa Mbangeni's heartfelt tribute to Nokuthula Ledwaba
 Nokuthula Ledwaba on being a mom

Living people
South African television actresses
1983 births
South African film actresses
People from Soweto